Victor Villarreal may refer to:

 Victor Villareal, boxer defeated by Marcos Reyes in September 2010
 Víctor Villareal, footballer with Atlético El Vigía
 Victor Villarreal, guitar player for Chicago band Cap'n Jazz